The Notebook is a 2013 Hungarian drama film directed by János Szász. It is based on the first novel, of the same name, of the 1986 prize winning trilogy by Ágota Kristóf.

Plot
Two twins are sent to a remote village where their grandmother lives so they can stay safe during the war. However they find out the village may not be as safe as they think when they are beaten by the village's residents.

Cast
András Gyémánt as One
László Gyémánt as Other
Gyöngyvér Bognár as Mother
Piroska Molnár as Grandmother
András Réthelyi as Orderly
Ulrich Thomsen as Officer
Orsolya Tóth as Harelip
János Derzsi as Sutor
Péter Andorai as Deacon
Miklós Székely B. as Old homeless
Krisztián Kovács as Deserter soldier
Ákos Köszegi as Hungarian officer
Ulrich Matthes as Father

Nominations and awards
The film was first released at the 48th Karlovy Vary International Film Festival in July 2013, where it won the Crystal Globe, as well as the Label Europa Cinemas award. In October of the same year it received a Special Mention at the Chicago International Film Festival. 

The film was also screened in the Contemporary World Cinema section of the 2013 Toronto International Film Festival. The film was selected as the Hungarian entry for the Best Foreign Language Film at the 86th Academy Awards, making the January shortlist.

See also
List of submissions to the 86th Academy Awards for Best Foreign Language Film
List of Hungarian submissions for the Academy Award for Best Foreign Language Film

References

External links

2013 films
2013 drama films
Hungarian drama films
2010s Hungarian-language films
Films directed by János Szász
Sony Pictures Classics films